The 2017 Ghazi Amanullah Khan Regional One Day Tournament was a List A cricket competition that took place in Afghanistan from 10 to 19 August 2017. It was the first edition of the competition to be played with List A status, following the announcements by the International Cricket Council (ICC) in February and May 2017. Five teams competed; Amo Region, Band-e-Amir Region, Boost Region, Mis Ainak Region and Speen Ghar Region. Speen Ghar Region won the tournament, beating Boost Region by five wickets in the final.

Fixtures

Points table

 Team qualified for the semi finals

Round robin

Finals

References

External links
 Series home at ESPN Cricinfo

Ghazi
Ghazi Amanullah Khan Regional One Day Tournament